Khan Baghi (also Romanized as Khān Bāghī; also known as Khān Bāqī) is a village in Baghan Rural District, Mahmeleh District, Khonj County, Fars Province, Iran. At the 2006 census, its population was 8, in 5 families.

References 

Populated places in Khonj County